Jordy Hultberg, is a former LSU basketball player (1976–80) and assistant basketball coach under Dale Brown (1980–83). Hultberg later became a broadcaster for LSU and the New Orleans Hornets.

Athletic career 
Hultberg was a shooting guard at LSU on Dale Brown's teams from 1976–1980. He was noted for his long shots before there was a three-point line in college basketball.

Coaching career 
After playing under Brown at LSU for four years, Hultberg became one of his assistant coaches from 1980–1983.

Broadcasting career

LSU 
In 1983, Jordy began his broadcasting career as a color commentator for the (then) newly developed LSU pay-per-view system known as "Tigervision". He was a sideline reporter for both the LSU Sports Radio Network broadcasts and the Cox Sports Television broadcasts of the LSU football games. He also hosted multiple shows on the LSU Sports Radio Network such as LSU Sunday Night Live, LSU Sports Journal and Inside LSU Football with Les Miles. He is also the host for LSU Tiger Tracks on Cox Sports Television.

New Orleans Hornets
Hultberg hosted Hornets Tonight, a pre-game show prior to every New Orleans Hornets telecast on Cox Sports Television. He also served as the courtside reporter and hosted the post-game show for the Hornets along with hosting the weekly Hornets Coaches Show.

Radio
Hultberg hosted a local radio show in Baton Rouge called "The Jordy Hultberg Show" on 1590-AM in Baton Rouge from 7-9am Monday through Friday. Currently, Hultberg hosts a local radio show on 103.7-FM in Lafayette from 2-4 PM Mon - Fri.

See also
List of New Orleans Pelicans broadcasters

References

Living people
American radio sports announcers
American television sports announcers
American men's basketball players
College basketball announcers in the United States
College football announcers
LSU Tigers basketball announcers
LSU Tigers basketball coaches
LSU Tigers basketball players
LSU Tigers football announcers
National Basketball Association broadcasters
New Orleans Hornets announcers
Point guards
Year of birth missing (living people)